18 Yellow Roses is an album by American singer Bobby Darin, released in 1963.

The entire album was reissued on CD in 2002 with Darin’s earlier release You’re the Reason I’m Living.

Reception

In his Allmusic review, critic Richie Unterberger praised the single “18 Yellow Roses” and its B-side “Not For Me” but generally panned the rest of the album, writing “otherwise 18 Yellow Roses sounds like a bit of a rush job rather than an artistic statement.”

Track listing
"18 Yellow Roses" (Bobby Darin) – 2:19
"On Broadway" (Jerry Leiber, Barry Mann, Mike Stoller, Cynthia Weil) – 2:37
"Ruby Baby" (Leiber, Stoller) – 2:16
"Reverend Mr. Black" (Leiber, Stoller, Billy Edd Wheeler) – 2:54
"End of the World" (Sylvia Dee, Arthur Kent) – 2:36
"Not for Me" (Darin) – 2:22
"Walk Right In" (Gus Cannon, Hosea Woods) – 2:33
"From a Jack to a King" (Ned Miller) – 1:57
"I Will Follow Her" (Arthur Altman, Norman Gimbel, Jacques Plante, Del Roma, J. W. Stole) – 2:29
"Our Day Will Come" (Mort Garson, Bob Hilliard) – 2:46
"Can't Get Used to Losing You" (Doc Pomus, Mort Shuman) – 2:12
"Rhythm of the Rain" (John Gummoe) – 2:06

Personnel
Bobby Darin – vocals
Jack Nitzsche – arranger, conductor

References 

1963 albums
Bobby Darin albums
Albums arranged by Jack Nitzsche
Albums produced by Nick Venet
Capitol Records albums